Saddar, literally meaning "cardinal", is the central area in the city of Hyderabad, Sindh, Pakistan. Saddar hosts the district and city's main governing bodies. It constitutes the centre of the city geographically and joins the suburbs at each end. The area includes the Cantonment area. Municipal duties fall under the civic agency Cantonment Board.

History 
The area known as Hyderabad cantt /or saddar, was built by the British in 1851. It was declared a cantonment in 1874.

Area 
The total area of Saddar was measured at 3015.642 acres (12020sq km). It has the population of 0.1012 million according to census 1998.

References

 
 
 
 
 

1851 establishments
Populated places in Hyderabad District, Pakistan